The Northeastern Nitro is a team that competes in the Women's Spring Football League that began play in the 2011 season.  They have recently relocated to CT. Formerly based in Danbury, Connecticut, the Nitro played its home games on the campus of Immaculate High School.

The Nitro initially announced that they were joining the Women's Spring Football League for the 2013 season.  However, prior to the season, the Nitro merged with the IWFL's Connecticut Wreckers.

Season-By-Season

|-
|2011 || 4 || 4 || 0 || 3rd National North || --
|-

* = Current Standing

2011 roster

2011

Standings

Season Schedule

References

External links
Northeastern Nitro Homepage

Women's Football Alliance teams
Women's Spring Football League teams
American football teams in Connecticut
Danbury, Connecticut
American football teams established in 2010
American football teams in the New York metropolitan area
2010 establishments in Connecticut
Sports in Fairfield County, Connecticut
Sports in Bridgeport, Connecticut
Women's sports in Connecticut